A dinosaur park usually refers to a theme park in which several life-size sculptures or models of prehistoric animals, especially dinosaurs are displayed. The first dinosaur park worldwide was Crystal Palace Dinosaurs, which opened in London in 1854. Other dinosaur parks are listed below.

Europe

Austria 
Styrassic Park in Bad Gleichenberg
Triassic Park in Waidring Tirol.

World of Dinosaurs: mobile exhibition with numerous stations in Europe. Currently in Perchtoldsdorf

Croatia 
Dinopark Funtana in Funtana, Istria

Czech Republic 
DinoPark Praha in Prague
DinoPark Ostrava in Ostrava
DinoPark Plzeň in Plzeň
DinoPark Liberec in Liberec
DinoPark Vyškov in Vyškov
Prehistoric Park in Chvalovice

France 
Dino-Zoo du Doubs in Charbonnières-les-Sapins
Parc Préhistorique de Bretagne in Malansac
Musée parc des dinosaures in Mèze
PréhistoDino Parc in Lacave en Quercy
Dinosaur'Istres in Istres

Germany 
:de:Dinosaur Park (Münchehagen) (Dinopark) in Rehburg-Loccum 
Dinosaur Park (Kleinwelka), Bautzen
Gondwana - Das Praehistorium in Schiffweiler, opened 2008
Dinosaur Land (Rügen) on Rügen, opened 2008
Traumlandpark 1977-1991 in Bottrop-Kirchhellen, then incorporated into the Bavaria Filmpark as DinoPark
Germendorf Wildlife Park in Germendorf. Park opened in 2002, dinosaur park section (Urzeitpark) opened in 2009
Dinosaur Park Teufelsschlucht in Ernzen, opened 2015

Greece 
Dinosauria Park near Heraklion, Crete
Dino Park Greece near Nea Moudania, Halkidiki

Italy 
Prehistoric Park, Rivolta d'Adda
 World of Dinosaurs, San Piero a Sieve
 Parco Preistorico, Peccioli
 Extinction Park at Parco Natura Viva, Bussolengo
 Parco della Preistoria Lost World at Atlantis Parco Acquatico, San Secondo of Pinerolo
 Parco Preistorico, Peccioli
 Dinopark, Avezzano
 Dino Park, San Lorenzello
 Parco Il Mondo della Preistoria, Simbario
 Parco dei Dinosauri, Castellana Grotte
 Parco delle Grotte di Famosa e la Grotta dei Dinosauri, Massafra
 Parco della Preistoria at Etnaland, Belpasso
 Parco dinosauri at Safari Park, Pombia

Lithuania 
 "Dino parkas" at Radailiai, Klaipeda region 
Lebanon
 Dino city - Prehistoric Park at Ajaltoun, Mount Lebanon, Lebanon

Montenegro 
 DinoSecrets Adventure Park in Budva.

Netherlands 
 Dierenpark Amersfoort, Amersfoort. Regular zoo with large 'DinoPark' section.
 Dinoland Zwolle, Zwolle.
 Oertijdmuseum, Boxtel.
 Duinrell, Wassenaar. Amusement park that is 'dinosaur-themed' in October.

North Macedonia 

 Dinosaur Park, Skopje, opened 2021.

Poland 
 Dinosaur parks and Miniature park in Wrocław
Bałtów Jurassic Park in Ostrowiec County
Dinozatorland in Zator
JuraPark in Krasiejów
JuraPark in Solec Kujawski
 Dinozaury-Krasnobród EducationPark   in Krasnobród www.dinozaury-krasnobrod.pl

Portugal 
 Dino Parque da Lourinhã, Lourinhã, opened in 2018

Romania
 Dino Park in Rasnov opened 2015

Russia 
 Dino Park Skazka in Moscow
 Dino Park Etnomir in Moscow Oblast
 Dino Park in Magnitogorsk
 Dino at Safari-park in Krasnodar
 Dino Park Rex in Stavropol

Serbia 
 DINO PARK, Novi Sad, to be opened in April 2016

Slovakia 
DinoPark Zoo Bratislava in Bratislava, opened in 2004 
DinoPark Zoo Košice in Košice, opened in 2013 
Dino Adventure Park in Terchová, opened in 2012 
Dino Adventure Park in Bojnice, opened in 2013

Spain 
Dinopark, Playa de Palma, Mallorca
 DinoPark Algar, Callosa d'en Sarrià 
Dinópolis, Teruel, Aragón.

Switzerland 
Saurierpark in Réclère, with dripstone cave in Réclère

United Kingdom 
 Blackpool Zoo's Dinosaur Safari in Blackpool, Lancashire
Jurassic Journey, Great Yarmouth, Norfolk
 West Midland Safari Park - Land of the Living Dinosaurs
Crystal Palace Dinosaurs, opened 1854, in London on the site of the Crystal Palace
Combe Martin Wildlife and Dinosaur park in North Devon
 Dinosaur Adventure Park, Lenwade, Norfolk
 Teessaurus Park, Middlesbrough
 National Showcaves Centre for Wales, Brecon Beacons
 Blair Drummond Safari Park near Stirling

North & Middle America

Canada 
Calgary Zoo in Calgary, Alberta, opened 1937. About 50 life-sized sculptures by 1960, including non-dinosaurs. Renovated in 1987, and most models replaced.
Royal Tyrrell Museum of Palaeontology, 6 km from Drumheller, Alberta
Jurassic Forest, north of Gibbons, Alberta
Budapest Park, Toronto, Ontario - Contains a statue of a Stegosaurus and Chasmosaurus.
Muskoka Dinosaur Land, Utterson, Ontario - permanently closed
Prehistoric World, Morrisburg, Ontario - Over 50 life sized dinosaurs.
Dinosaurs Alive!, Vaughan, Ontario. Located inside Wonderland, featured more than 40 life size animatronic dinosaurs before closing in 2019.

United States 
Dinosaur World, Beaver, Arkansas (1960s-2005)
Cabazon Dinosaurs, Cabazon, California
Dinosaur State Park and Arboretum in Rocky Hill, Connecticut
The Dinosaur Place at Nature's Art Village in Montville, Connecticut
Dinosaur World, Plant City, Florida, opened 1998
Bongoland, Port Orange, Florida, now part of the Dunlawton Plantation and Sugar Mill
Jurassic Park at Universal's Islands of Adventure in Orlando, Florida. The whole park is not dedicated to dinosaurs, but this land is.
DinoLand U.S.A. at Disney's Animal Kingdom Park in Bay Lake, Florida. The whole park is not dedicated to dinosaurs, but this land is.
Dinosaur World, Cave City, Kentucky
Dinosaur Gardens Prehistorical Zoo, Ossineke, Michigan, opened 1930s
Dinosaur Playground, Riverside Park, New York City. Has two fiberglass dinosaurs.
Field Station: Dinosaurs, Overpeck County Park, Bergen County, New Jersey. Was originally located in Secacus.
Field Station: Dinosaurs, Derby, Kansas, opened in 2018.
Dinosaurs Alive at Cedar Point Amusement Park, Sandusky, Ohio (2012–2018)
Prehistoric Gardens, Port Orford, Oregon, opened 1955. Has at least 16 full-sized models, including non-dinosaurs.
Dinosaur Park in Rapid City, South Dakota, opened 1936
Dinosaur Park, Cedar Creek, Texas
Dinosaur World, Glen Rose, Texas
George S. Eccles Dinosaur Park, Ogden, Utah over 100 life sized prehistoric creatures, a functioning paleontology lab, and a fossil and gemstone museum.
Dinosaur Kingdom II, Natural Bridge, Virginia, featuring 30 dinosaur sculptures in a fantasy U.S. Civil-War-themed setting
Jerrassic Park at Military Aviation Museum, Virginia Beach, Virginia
Dinosaur Land, White Post, Virginia, opened 1963, over 50 dinosaur sculptures
Hisey Park, Granger, Washington
Dinosaur Park in Bluff City, Tennessee with over 40 dinosaur sculptures

Cuba 
Valle de la Prehistoria, in the Baconao Park outside of Santiago de Cuba, opened in the 1980s.

Guatemala 
Dino Park, Santa Cruz Muluá, Quetzaltenango, Gutaemala

Asia

Pakistan 

Dino valley.
Lying in the lap of Margalla Hills National Park, this is kids 'must see' place. It's the first dinosaur theme park of Pakistan.

Cambodia 
Dinosaurs Alive, Phnom Penh

India 

 Indroda Dinosaur and Fossil Park, Gandhinagar, Gujarat
 Dinosaur Fossil Park, Raiyoli, Balasinor, Gujarat

Indonesia 
Dinosaur Adventure, Taman Mini Indonesia Indah

Thailand 
Si Wiang Dinosaur Park, Wiang Kao District, Khon Kaen Province

Iran 
Jurassic park, Khorasane-razavi, Mashhad

Australia
 Palmersaurus at Palmer Coolum Resort. Opened 14 December 2013

See also 
Jurassic Park (novel)
Jurassic Park (film)
List of films featuring dinosaurs

References

External links 

Roadside Dinosaurs (http://www.roadarch.com/dinos/main.html)

Dinosaur
Dinosaur
Dinosaurs in amusement parks